Lauri Pajuniemi (born 12 September 1999) is a Finnish professional ice hockey player for the Hartford Wolf Pack of the American Hockey League (AHL) while under contract to the New York Rangers of the National Hockey League (NHL). Pajuniemi was selected in the fifth round, 132nd overall, of the 2018 NHL Entry Draft by the Rangers.

Playing career
In the 2019–20 season, Pajuniemi's 26 goals scored with HC TPS tied for third in Liiga with Eemeli Suomi, behind just Julius Nättinen and Justin Danforth.  Pajuniemi credited his emergence from a 3rd or 4th line role player into a significant goal scorer to his coaches' telling him to have confidence that he could score more than one goal a game.

On 29 April 2021, Pajuniemi was signed by the New York Rangers to a two-year, entry-level contract.

Career statistics

Regular season and playoffs

International

References

External links

1999 births
Living people
Finnish ice hockey right wingers
Hartford Wolf Pack players
New York Rangers draft picks
Ice hockey people from Tampere
HC TPS players
TuTo players